The Estadio Valentín González is a multi-use stadium in Xochimilco, Mexico City, Mexico.  It is currently used mostly for football matches and is the home stadium for Atlético Capitalino.  The stadium has a capacity of 5,000 people and hosts Liga de Balompié Mexicano and amateur soccer matches.

References

External links
LIGA MX - Página Oficial de la Liga Mexicana del Fútbol Profesional

Sports venues in Mexico City
Football venues in Mexico
Athletics (track and field) venues in Mexico